Kim Won-chol is a North Korean former footballer. He represented North Korea on at least one occasion in 1982, scoring once.

Career statistics

International

International goals
Scores and results list North Korea's goal tally first, score column indicates score after each North Korea goal.

References

Date of birth unknown
Living people
North Korean footballers
North Korea international footballers
Association footballers not categorized by position
Footballers at the 1982 Asian Games
Asian Games competitors for North Korea
Year of birth missing (living people)